Buffalo Trail Public Schools Regional Division No. 28 or Buffalo Trail Public Schools is a public school authority within the Canadian province of Alberta operated out of Wainwright.

See also 
List of school authorities in Alberta

References

External links 

 
School districts in Alberta